TEAD2 (ETF, ETEF-1, TEF-4), together with TEAD1, defines a novel family of transcription factors, the TEAD family, highly conserved through evolution. 
TEAD proteins were notably found in Drosophila (Scalloped), C. elegans (egl -44), S. cerevisiae and A. nidulans. 
TEAD2 has been less studied than TEAD1 but a few studies revealed its role during development.

Function 
TEAD2 is a member of the mammalian TEAD transcription factor family (initially named the transcriptional enhancer factor (TEF) family), which contain the TEA/ATTS DNA-binding domain. Members of the family in mammals are TEAD1, TEAD2, TEAD3, TEAD4.

Tissue distribution 
TEAD2 is selectively expressed in a subset of embryonic tissues including the cerebellum, testis, and distal portions of the forelimb and hindlimb buds, as well as the tail bud, but it is essentially absent from adult tissues. TEAD2 has also been shown to be expressed very early during development, i.e. from the 2-cell stage.

TEAD orthologs 
TEAD proteins are found in many organisms under different names, assuming different functions. 
For example, in Saccharomyces cerevisiae TEC-1 regulates the transposable element TY1 and is involved in pseudohyphale growth (the elongated shape that yeasts take when grown in nutrient-poor conditions). 
In Aspergillus nidulans, the TEA domain protein ABAA regulates the differentiation of conidiophores.
In drosophila the transcription factor Scalloped is involved in the development of the wing disc, survival and cell growth.
Finally in Xenopus, it has been demonstrated that the homolog of TEAD regulates muscle differentiation.

Function 

 Regulation of mouse neural development
 Neuron proliferation
 Regulation of proliferation
 Regulation of apoptosis

Post transcriptional modifications 
TEAD1 can be palmitoylated on a conserved cysteine at the C-term of the protein. This post-translational modification is critical for proper folding of TEAD proteins and their stability.
Based on bioinformatics evidence TEAD2 can be ubiquitinylated at Lys75 and several phosphorylation sites exist in the protein.

Cofactors 
TEAD transcription factors have to associate with cofactors to be able to induce the transcription of target genes. Concerning TEAD2 very few studies have shown specific cofactors. But due to the high homology between the TEAD family members its believed that TEAD proteins may share cofactors. Here are presented the cofactor that interact with TEAD2.
 TEAD2 interacts with all members of the SRC family of steroid receptor coactivators. It has been shown in HeLa cells that TEAD2 and SRC induce gene expression.
 SRF (Serum response factor) and TEAD2 interact through their DNA binding domain, respectively the MADS domain and the TEA domain. In vitro studies demonstrated that this interaction leads to the activation of the skeletal muscle α-actin promoter.
 TEAD proteins and MEF2 (myocyte enhancer factor 2) interact physically. The binding of MEF2 on the DNA induces and potentiates TEAD2 recruitment at MCAT sequences that are adjacent to MEF2 binding sites.
 The four Vestigial-like (VGLL) proteins are able to interact with all TEADs. The precise function of TEAD and VGLL interaction is still poorly understood. It has been shown that TEAD/VGLL1 complexes promote anchorage-independent cell proliferation in prostate cancer cell lines suggesting a role in cancer progression.
 The interaction between YAP (Yes Associated Protein 65), TAZ, a transcriptional coactivator paralog to YAP, and all TEAD proteins was demonstrated both in vitro and in vivo. In both cases the interaction of the proteins leads to increased TEAD transcriptional activity. YAP/TAZ are effectors of the Hippo tumor suppressor pathway that restricts organ growth by keeping in check cell proliferation and promoting apoptosis in mammals and also in Drosophila.

Clinical significance 
Recent animal models indicating a possible association of TEAD2 with anencephaly.

Notes

References

Further reading

External links 
 

Transcription factors